The Netherlands women's national softball team is the national team of the Kingdom of the Netherlands. It is governed by the Royal Netherlands Baseball and Softball Federation. It is a member nation of the Confederation of European Baseball and the International Baseball Federation.

History
The team competed at the 1990 ISF Women's World Championship where they finished with five wins and four losses. The team competed at the 1994 ISF Women's World Championship where they finished eighth. The team competed at the 1998 ISF Women's World Championship where they finished ninth. The team competed at the 2002 ISF Women's World Championship where they finished eleventh. The team competed at the 2010 ISF Women's World Championship where they finished eighth.

They have won the Women's Softball European Championship eleven times, second most to only Italy. Their latest European title came in 2022.

Results

European Championship

Olympics

Other tournaments 
 Japan Softball Cup
 2006: 4th

List of managers

References

External links
 Official website ISF
 Official website Dutch women's softbalteam

Softball
Women's national softball teams
Softball in the Netherlands